In enzymology, a sucrose:sucrose fructosyltransferase is an enzyme that catalyzes the chemical reaction

2 sucrose  D-glucose + beta-D-fructofuranosyl-(2->1)-beta-D-fructofuranosyl + alpha-D-glucopyranoside

Hence, this enzyme has one substrate, sucrose, but 3 products: D-glucose, [[beta-D-fructofuranosyl-(2->1)-beta-D-fructofuranosyl]], and alpha-D-glucopyranoside.

This enzyme belongs to the family of glycosyltransferases, specifically the hexosyltransferases.  The systematic name of this enzyme class is sucrose:sucrose 1'-beta-D-fructosyltransferase. Other names in common use include SST, sucrose:sucrose 1-fructosyltransferase, sucrose-sucrose 1-fructosyltransferase, sucrose 1F-fructosyltransferase, and sucrose:sucrose 1F-beta-D-fructosyltransferase.

References

 
 

EC 2.4.1
Enzymes of unknown structure